HD 2039 b is an extrasolar planet orbiting the star HD 2039. It is almost five times as massive as Jupiter and has a very eccentric orbit.

References

External links
 The Extrasolar Planets Encyclopaedia: HD 2039

Phoenix (constellation)
Giant planets
Exoplanets discovered in 2002
Exoplanets detected by radial velocity